Joseph Syoz (18 January 1937 – 13 January 2013) was a French boxer. He competed in the men's heavyweight event at the 1960 Summer Olympics.

References

1937 births
2013 deaths
French male boxers
Olympic boxers of France
Boxers at the 1960 Summer Olympics
Sportspeople from Aisne
Heavyweight boxers